The 2006 All-Ireland Senior Hurling Championship Final was a hurling match held at Croke Park, Dublin on 3 September 2006.  The match was the 119th All-Ireland hurling final and was contested by Kilkenny and Cork, with Kilkenny putting in a fiercely determined and intense performance to win 1–16 to 1–13. It was the first meeting of these two sides in the All-Ireland final since 2004 when Cork were the winners. Cork were aiming to capture a third All-Ireland title in succession while Kilkenny, under the leadership of Brian Cody, were hoping to capture a first title since 2003.  The prize for the winning team was the Liam MacCarthy Cup. While in recent years the All-Ireland final has been held on the second Sunday in September, the 2006 final was held a week earlier than normal in order to avoid a clash with golf's Ryder Cup.

Previous championship encounters
This particular fixture has been frequent in the history of the All-Ireland Senior Hurling Championship. Kilkenny had played Cork a total of twenty-three times in the All-Ireland Senior Hurling Championship.  As of 2006 Kilkenny had recorded twelve wins over the great rivals while Cork had defeated Kilkenny on nine occasions.  There were two draws between the sides.

Paths to the final

Kilkenny

Cork

Match details

References

All-Ireland Senior Hurling Championship Final
All-Ireland Senior Hurling Championship Final, 2006
All-Ireland Senior Hurling Championship Final
All-Ireland Senior Hurling Championship Finals
Cork county hurling team matches
Kilkenny GAA matches